The 1998 Big League World Series took place from August 14–22 in Fort Lauderdale, Florida, United States. Thousand Oaks, California defeated Venezuela in the championship game. This was the final BLWS held in Fort Lauderdale.

Teams

Results

United States Pool

International Pool

Elimination Round

References

Big League World Series
Big League World Series